The 2015–16 Furman Paladins women's basketball team represented Furman University during the 2015–16 NCAA Division I women's basketball season. The Paladins, led by sixth-year head coach Jackie Carson, played their home games at Timmons Arena and were members of the Southern Conference. They finished the season 15–16, 7–7 in SoCon play to finish in fifth place.

References

Furman
Furman Paladins women's basketball seasons